This is a list of the main association football rivalries in Greece.

Athens derbies
Derbies between 'The Big Three'
Derby of the eternal enemies: Olympiakos vs. Panathinaikos
A.E.K.-Panathinaikos rivalry:  AEK Athens vs. Panathinaikos
A.E.K.–Olympiacos rivalry: AEK Athens vs. Olympiakos
West Athens derby: Egaleo vs. Atromitos Peristeri
Smyrna derby: Apollon Smyrna vs. Panionios
South Athens derby: Kallithea vs. Panionios
Panionios-Atromitos derby: Panionios vs. Atromitos Peristeri
AEK-Apollon rivalry: Apollon Smyrna vs. AEK Athens
Any match between Panionios and either AEK Athens or Panathinaikos.
Piraeus derbies:
Piraeus Derby: Ethnikos Piraeus vs. Olympiakos
Nikaia derby: Proodeftiki vs. Ionikos
Thessaloniki Derbies
Derby of Northern Greece: Aris Thessaloniki vs. PAOK Thessaloniki
Iraklis 1908 FC vs. Aris Thessaloniki or PAOK Thessaloniki
Apollon Kalamarias vs. Agrotikos Asteras 
Athens-Thessaloniki rivalry
Double-headed eagles derby: AEK Athens vs. PAOK Thessaloniki
Olympiacos–P.A.O.K. rivalry: PAOK Thessaloniki vs. Olympiakos
Panathinaikos–PAOK rivalry: Panathinaikos vs. PAOK Thessaloniki
Aris Thessaloniki vs. AEK Athens or Olympiakos or Panathinaikos
Volos Derbies
Volos Derby: Niki Volou vs. Olympiakos Volou 
Larissa Derbies
AEL Larissa vs. Apollon Larissa
Cretan derby: Ergotelis vs. OFI Crete
West Thessaly derby: Anagennisi Karditsa vs. Trikala F.C.
Thessaly derby: AE Larissa vs. Niki Volou or Olympiakos Volou
Karditsa derby: A.O. Karditsa vs. Anagennisi Karditsa
West Peloponnese derby: Kalamata vs. Paniliakos or Messiniakos
East Macedonia derby: Doxa Drama vs. Kavala
Rhodes derby: Rodos vs. Diagoras
Imathia derby: Veria vs. Naoussa or Pontioi Veria
Epirus derby: PAS Giannina vs. Anagennisi Arta or Kerkyra or Preveza or Panetolikos
Aetolia Akarnania derby: Panetolikos vs. A.E. Messolonghi
Arcadia derby: Astera Tripoli vs. Panarkadikos
East Peloponnese derby: Panargiakos vs. Panarkadikos
Drama derby: Doxa Drama vs. Pandramaikos
Achaea derby: Panachaiki vs. Panegialios
Pieria derby: Pierikos vs. A.E. Karitsa or Ethnikos Katerini
Chania derby: Chania vs. Platanias

References

 
Football in Greece